Minuscule 125 (in the Gregory-Aland numbering), ε 1028 (Von Soden numbering). It is a Greek minuscule manuscript of the New Testament on a parchment. Palaeographically it has been assigned to the 11th century. The manuscript has survived in complete condition. It has with full marginalia (completed by a later hand).

Description 

The manuscript contains the text of the four Gospels on 306 parchment leaves. The text is written in one column per page, 23 lines per page. The capital letters are written in colour.

There is also another division according to the smaller Ammonian Sections (Mark 234), with references to the Eusebian Canons (written below Ammonian Section numbers).

It has many corrections in the margin and between the lines.

Text 

The Greek text of the codex is a representative of the Byzantine text-type. Aland placed it to Category V.

According to the Claremont Profile Method it represents the textual family Kx in Luke 1 and Luke 20. In Luke 10 no profile was made.

History 

It was examined by Treschow, Alter, and Birch. Alter used it in his edition of the Greek text of the New Testament. C. R. Gregory saw it in 1887.

Currently the codex is located at the Austrian National Library (Theol. Gr. 60) at Vienna.

See also 

 List of New Testament minuscules
 Biblical manuscript

References

Further reading 

 F.K. Alter, Novum Testamentum Graecum, ad Codicem Vindobonensem Graece expressum: Varietam Lectionis addidit Franciscus Carolus Alter, 2 vols. 8vo, Vienna, 1786-1787.

External links 

 

Greek New Testament minuscules
11th-century biblical manuscripts
Biblical manuscripts of the Austrian National Library